Álvaro Caminha was appointed by King John II of Portugal in 1492 Captain-major (governor) – apparently the third – of the Portuguese colony of São Tomé and Príncipe which had been discovered 22 years earlier.

He was a knight of the king's household and was told to settle and "Christianize" the then deserted island with his family and friars, and for that purpose was apparently given the children of Spanish Jewish refugees from Granada, which had not been able to pay the tax requested by the king, and who were married to Black people from the Congo.

References

 Valentim Fernandes (1506), Descrição da Ilha de São Tomé, in: A. Baião and J. Bensaúde (1940), O manuscrito de Valentim Fernandes, Lisboa, Ática.
 Descriptio Africae Codex hisp. 27 in: Bayerische Staatsbibliothek, Munich, Manuscript Collection, Bild 416.

15th-century births
1499 deaths
Portuguese explorers
Year of birth missing
15th-century explorers of Africa
15th-century Portuguese people
Governors of Portuguese São Tomé and Príncipe
History of São Tomé and Príncipe